The Great Vowel Shift was a series of changes in the pronunciation of the English language that took place primarily between 1400 and 1700, beginning in southern England and today having influenced effectively all dialects of English. Through this vowel shift, the pronunciation of all Middle English long vowels was changed. Some consonant sounds changed as well, particularly those that became silent; the term Great Vowel Shift is sometimes used to include these consonantal changes.

The standardization of English spelling began in the 15th and 16th centuries, and the Great Vowel Shift is the major reason English spellings now often deviate considerably from how they represent pronunciations. The Great Vowel Shift was first studied by Otto Jespersen (1860–1943), a Danish linguist and Anglicist, who coined the term.

Causes
The causes of the Great Vowel Shift are unknown and have been a source of intense scholarly debate; as yet, there is no firm consensus. The greatest changes occurred during the 15th and 16th centuries, and their origins are at least partly phonetic.

 Population migration: This is the most accepted theory; some scholars have argued that the rapid migration of peoples to the southeast of England from the east and central Midlands of England following the Black Death produced a clash of dialects that made Londoners distinguish their speech from the immigrants who came from other English cities by changing their vowel system.
 French loan words: Others argue that the influx of French loanwords was a major factor in the shift. 
 Middle class hypercorrection: Yet others assert that because of the increasing prestige of French pronunciations among the middle classes (perhaps related to the English aristocracy's switching from French to English around this time), a process of hypercorrection may have started a shift that unintentionally resulted in vowel pronunciations that are inaccurate imitations of French pronunciations. 
 War with France: An opposing theory states that the wars with France and general anti-French sentiments caused hypercorrection deliberately to make English sound less like French.

Overall changes
The main difference between the pronunciation of Middle English in the year 1400 and Modern English (Received Pronunciation) is in the value of the long vowels.

Long vowels in Middle English had "continental" values, much like those in Italian and Standard German; in standard Modern English, they have entirely different pronunciations. The differing pronunciations of English vowel letters do not stem from the Great Shift as such but rather because English spelling did not adapt to the changes.

German had undergone vowel changes quite similar to the Great Shift in a slightly earlier period but the spelling was changed accordingly (e.g. Middle High German  → modern German  "to bite").

This timeline shows the main vowel changes that occurred between late Middle English in the year 1400 and Received Pronunciation in the mid-20th century by using representative words. The Great Vowel Shift occurred in the lower half of the table, between 1400 and 1600–1700.

The changes that happened after 1700 are not considered part of the Great Vowel Shift. Pronunciation is given in the International Phonetic Alphabet:

Details

Middle English vowel system

Before the Great Vowel Shift, Middle English in Southern England had seven long vowels, . The vowels occurred in, for example, the words bite, meet, meat, mate, boat, boot, and out, respectively.

The words had very different pronunciations in Middle English from their pronunciations in Modern English.

 Long i in bite was pronounced as  so Middle English bite sounded like Modern English beet .
 Long e in meet was pronounced as  so Middle English meet sounded similar to Modern English mate  

In addition, Middle English had: 
 Long  in beat, like modern short e in bed but pronounced longer, and
 Long  in boat.

Changes
After around 1300, the long vowels of Middle English began changing in pronunciation as follows:

 Diphthongisation – The two close vowels, became diphthongs (vowel breaking). 
 Vowel raising – The other five, underwent an increase in tongue height (raising).

These changes occurred over several centuries and can be divided into two phases.

The Great Vowel Shift changed vowels without merger so Middle English before the vowel shift had the same number of vowel phonemes as Early Modern English after the vowel shift.

After the Great Vowel Shift, some vowel phonemes began merging.

However, during the 16th and the 17th centuries, there were many different mergers, and some mergers can be seen in individual Modern English words like great, which is pronounced with the vowel  as in mate rather than the vowel  as in meat.

This is a simplified picture of the changes that happened between late Middle English (late ME), Early Modern English (EModE), and today's English (ModE). Pronunciations in 1400, 1500, 1600, and 1900 are shown. To hear recordings of the sounds, click the phonetic symbols.

Before labial consonants and also after ,  did not shift, and  remains as in soup and room (its Middle English spelling was roum).

First phase
The first phase of the Great Vowel Shift affected the Middle English close-mid vowels , as in beet and boot, and the close vowels , as in bite and out. The close-mid vowels  became close , and the close vowels  became diphthongs. The first phase was complete in 1500, meaning that by that time, words like beet and boot had lost their Middle English pronunciation, and were pronounced with the same vowels as in Modern English. The words bite and out were pronounced with diphthongs, but not the same diphthongs as in Modern English.

Scholars agree that the Middle English close vowels  became diphthongs around the year 1500, but disagree about what diphthongs they changed to. This sequence of events is supported by the testimony of orthoepists before Hodges in 1644.

Evidence from northern English and Scots (see below) suggests that the close-mid vowels  were the first to shift.  As the Middle English vowels  were raised towards , they forced the original Middle English  out of place and caused them to become diphthongs .  This type of sound change, in which one vowel's pronunciation shifts so that it is pronounced like a second vowel, and the second vowel is forced to change its pronunciation, is called a push chain.

However, according to professor Jürgen Handke, for some time, there was a phonetic split between words with the vowel  and the diphthong , in words where the Middle English  shifted to the Modern English .  For an example, high was pronounced with the vowel , and like and my were pronounced with the diphthong . Therefore, for logical reasons, the close vowels  could have diphthongised before the close-mid vowels  raised.  Otherwise, high would probably rhyme with thee rather than my.  This type of chain is called a drag chain.

Second phase
The second phase of the Great Vowel Shift affected the Middle English open vowel , as in mate, and the Middle English open-mid vowels , as in meat and boat.

Later mergers
During the first and the second phases of the Great Vowel Shift, long vowels were shifted without merging with other vowels, but after the second phase, several vowels merged.

During the 16th and 17th centuries, several different pronunciation variants existed among different parts of the population for words like meet, meat, mate, and day. In each pronunciation variant, different pairs or trios of words were merged in pronunciation. Four different pronunciation variants are shown in the table below. The fourth pronunciation variant gave rise to Modern English pronunciation. In Modern English, meet and meat are merged in pronunciation and both have the vowel , and mate and day are merged with the diphthong , which developed from the 16th-century long vowel .

Modern English typically has the meet–meat merger: both meet and meat are pronounced with the vowel . Words like great and steak, however, have merged with mate and are pronounced with the vowel , which developed from the  shown in the table above.

Northern English and Scots
The Great Vowel Shift affected other dialects as well as the standard English of southern England but in different ways. In Northern England, the shift did not operate on the long back vowels because they had undergone an earlier shift.

The first step in the Great Vowel Shift in Northern and Southern English is shown in the table below. These developments below fall under the label "older" to refer to Scots and a more conservative and increasingly rural Northern sound, while "younger" refers to a more mainstream Northern sound largely emerging just since the twentieth century.

The vowel systems of Northern and Southern Middle English immediately before the Great Vowel Shift were different in one way. In Northern Middle English, the back close-mid vowel  in boot had already shifted to front  (a sound change known as fronting), like the long  in German   "hear". Thus, Southern English had a back close-mid vowel , but Northern English did not:

In both Northern and Southern English, the first step of the Great Vowel Shift raised the close-mid vowels to become close.

If the difference between the Northern and Southern vowel shifts is caused by the vowel systems at the time of the Great Vowel Shift,  did not shift because there was no back mid vowel  in Northern English.

See also
 Canaanite Shift
 High German consonant shift
 Slavic palatalisation
 Ingvaeonic nasal spirant law
 Grimm's law
 Chain shift
 "The Chaos" - a poem using the irregularity of English spelling and pronunciation
History of English
Phonological history of English vowels
Vowel shift

Explanatory notes

Sources

Citations

General and cited sources 

 
 
 
  Studying Phonetics on the Net.
  (See vol. 2, 594–713 for discussion of long stressed vowels)

External links
 Great Vowel Shift Video lecture
 
 

History of the English language
Vowel shifts